Labeobarbus brevispinis is a species of cyprinid fish endemic to Cameroon in Africa.

References 

Fish described in 1927
Cyprinid fish of Africa
Endemic fauna of Cameroon
brevispinis